Al Palewicz (born March 23, 1950) is a former American football linebacker. He played for the Kansas City Chiefs from 1973 to 1975 and for the New York Jets in 1977.

References

1950 births
Living people
American football linebackers
Miami Hurricanes football players
Kansas City Chiefs players
New York Jets players
Players of American football from Fort Worth, Texas
Sportspeople from Miami-Dade County, Florida
Miami Palmetto Senior High School alumni
Players of American football from Florida